Charaxes marmax, the yellow rajah, is a butterfly found in India that belongs to the rajahs and nawabs group, that is, the Charaxinae group of the brush-footed butterflies family.

Description
The male has the ground colour of the upperside rich ochraceous tawny. Forewing has a black subcostal spot at the discocellulars and a pale chestnut line on either side of them; a very short slightly curved discal narrow band from vein 7 to vein 5, a postdiscal broad oblique band from costa to vein 6, and a broad terminal band from apex to vein 1, jet-black; the extreme margin of the termen touched interruptedly with fulvous tawny; the postdiscal band continued as a curved lunular narrow chestnut band to vein 1, and the black at apex continued along the costa, joining the postdiscal band above. Hindwing: costal margin broadly pale yellow, terminal third of wing of a darker tawny shade than the base, a short discal broken black line from costa to vein 6; a subterminal slightly curved series of outwardly pointed black spots, increasing in size to interspace 6, the tornal two centred with white; the terminal margin somewhat broadly dark reddish brown. Underside bright ochraceous yellow. Forewings and hindwings crossed by the usual sinuous black lines, the postdiscal line outwardly lunular. Forewing: the discocellulars defined by dark lines, the apex with two short white streaks continued as a line of obscure white dots to interspace 1. Hindwing: the space between base of wing and subbasal dark line and between the median two dark lines darker ochraceous than the ground colour; the postdiscal lunular line with a dark shade beyond, traversed by a series of heavy slate-black lunules, and white, black-tipped obscure dots; the terminal reddish-brown band as on the upperside. Antennae black annulated with white; head, thorax and abdomen tawny; beneath paler, the palpi white.

The female is similar but the ground colour on the disc paler. Forewing: the short discal band very broad, continued as a series of lunules in the interspaces to vein 1: the postdiscal lunular line slender above, not joined onto the black on the termen, and sometimes black, sometimes chestnut-coloured; the black on the margin formed into a subterminal series of large black inwardly conical spots, the termen beyond dusky ochraceous. Hindwing: the subterminal row of black spots with white central transverse very short lines. Underside much as in the male, but the slate-black lunules on the hindwing form a broad obliquely placed line; the subterminal series of white spots larger and more conspicuous both on forewing and hindwing; upper tail spatulate, much longer than in male.

Distribution
Northeastern India (Sikkim, Assam), Bhutan and Burma, Peninsular Malaya and Indochina.

See also

Charaxinae
Nymphalidae
List of butterflies of India
List of butterflies of India (Nymphalidae)

Notes

Other references
 

marmax
Butterflies of Asia
Butterflies of Indochina
Butterflies described in 1848